Nyree Dawn Porter OBE (born Ngaire Dawn Porter; 22 January 1936 – 10 April 2001) was a New Zealand–British actress.

Early life and career
Porter was born in Napier, New Zealand in 1936. Her first professional work was touring with the New Zealand Players Trust. She was acclaimed for such roles as Jessica in The Merchant of Venice and Juliet in Romanoff and Juliet. She also performed in revues and musicals. She moved to Britain in 1958 after winning a Miss Cinema talent competition for young actresses organised by Rank, with the prize of a round-the-world trip and a film test in London. Although the test was probably little more than a publicity stunt, she decided to stay and was soon acting in the theatre. Look Who's Here at the Fortune Theatre in Drury Lane was her first West End appearance. She followed this with the role of Connie in Neil Simon's first West End play, Come Blow Your Horn, and a string of other appearances. She had two roles in Stephen Sondheim's Sunday in the Park with George, at the National Theatre in 1990 and played Olivia in Twelfth Night at the Shaw Theatre, and Rosalind in As You Like It at the Ludlow Festival. She later toured in Australia, in Jeffrey Archer's Beyond Reasonable Doubt, and later in The King and I.

Television and films
She appeared in several television productions, including an early episode of The Avengers ("Death on The Slipway", 1961); and the title role in the BBC's 1964 adaptation of Madame Bovary.

Porter is probably best remembered for her role as Irene in the hit BBC series The Forsyte Saga. The 1967 series, which attracted audiences of 18 million, saw her described by critics as "the first romantic sex symbol of the telly age." She herself said, "I was an unknown theatre actress and Irene gave me international fame and opened doors for me".

Although subsequently finding similar high-profile roles harder to come by, she starred in the 1968 comedy series Never a Cross Word and four years later opposite Robert Vaughn in Gerry Anderson's live-action series The Protectors. Porter also played the title role in the 26-part daytime serial For Maddie with Love, as a woman with only a few months left to live. Her husband was played by Ian Hendry. The programme ran for two series, in 1980 and 1981.

Her film appearances included Live Now, Pay Later (1962), The Cracksman (1963), Two Left Feet (1963), and two horror anthologies: The House That Dripped Blood (1971) and From Beyond the Grave (1974). She also appeared in Hilary and Jackie (1998) as the ballerina Dame Margot Fonteyn.

Awards and honours
In the 1970 Birthday Honours, Porter was appointed an Officer of the Order of the British Empire (OBE) for services to television.

In 1975, she won the Spanish TP de Oro 'Best Foreign Actress' award for The Protectors.

Personal life
Her first husband, Byron O'Leary, died in 1970 of an accidental drug overdose. In 1975 she married actor Robin Halstead after the birth of their daughter, Natalya Francesca Halstead. The couple divorced in 1987.

Death
She died in Wandsworth, London, in 2001 from leukaemia, aged 65. She was cremated at Putney Vale Crematorium and her ashes buried in the cemetery there.

Filmography

Film

Television

Notes

References

External links
Obituary in The Guardian

1936 births
2001 deaths
Burials at Putney Vale Cemetery
Deaths from cancer in England
Deaths from leukemia
New Zealand television actresses
New Zealand film actresses
New Zealand stage actresses
New Zealand emigrants to the United Kingdom
Officers of the Order of the British Empire
People from Napier, New Zealand
20th-century New Zealand actresses